Kalmand may refer to:
 Cămin, Romania
 Kalmand, Iran